In mathematics, a Euclidean distance matrix is an  matrix representing the spacing of a set of  points in Euclidean space.
For points  in -dimensional space , the elements of their Euclidean distance matrix  are given by squares of distances between them.
That is

In the context of (not necessarily Euclidean) distance matrices, the entries are usually defined directly as distances, not their squares.
However, in the Euclidean case, squares of distances are used to avoid computing square roots and to simplify relevant theorems and algorithms.

Euclidean distance matrices are closely related to Gram matrices (matrices of dot products, describing norms of vectors and angles between them).
The latter are easily analyzed using methods of linear algebra.
This allows to characterize Euclidean distance matrices and recover the points  that realize it.
A realization, if it exists, is unique up to rigid transformations, i.e. distance-preserving transformations of Euclidean space (rotations, reflections, translations).

In practical applications, distances are noisy measurements or come from arbitrary dissimilarity estimates (not necessarily metric).
The goal may be to visualize such data by points in Euclidean space whose distance matrix approximates a given dissimilarity matrix as well as possible — this is known as multidimensional scaling.
Alternatively, given two sets of data already represented by points in Euclidean space, one may ask how similar they are in shape, that is, how closely can they be related by a distance-preserving transformation — this is Procrustes analysis.
Some of the distances may also be missing or come unlabelled (as an unordered set or multiset instead of a matrix), leading to more complex algorithmic tasks, such as the graph realization problem or the turnpike problem (for points on a line).

Properties

By the fact that Euclidean distance is a metric, the matrix  has the following properties.

  is symmetric (i.e. ).
  (by the triangle inequality)
 

If the points  are in general position, the rank is exactly 

Distances can be shrunk by any power to obtain another Euclidean distance matrix. That is, if  is a Euclidean distance matrix, then  is a Euclidean distance matrix for every .

Relation to Gram matrix
The Gram matrix of a sequence of points  in -dimensional space 
is the  matrix  of their dot products (here a point  is thought of as a vector from 0 to that point):
In particular
Thus the Gram matrix describes norms and angles of vectors (from 0 to) .

Let  be the  matrix containing  as columns.
Then
 , because  (seeing  as a column vector).

To relate the Euclidean distance matrix to the Gram matrix, observe that
 

That is, the norms and angles determine the distances.
Note that the Gram matrix contains additional information: distances from 0. 

Conversely, distances  between pairs of  points  determine dot products between  vectors :
 
(this is known as the polarization identity).

Characterizations
For a  matrix , a sequence of points  in -dimensional Euclidean space 
One can assume without loss of generality that  (because translating by  preserves distances).

This follows from the previous discussion because  is positive semidefinite of rank at most  if and only if it can be decomposed as  where  is an  matrix.
Therefore, any method to decompose  allows to find a realization.

The statement of theorem distinguishes the first point . A more symmetric variant of the same theorem is the following:

Other characterizations involve Cayley–Menger determinants.
In particular, these allow to show that a symmetric hollow  matrix is realizable in  if and only if every  principal submatrix is.
In other words, a semimetric on finitely many points is embedabble isometrically in  if and only if every   points are.

In practice, the definiteness or rank conditions may fail due to numerical errors, noise in measurements, or due to the data not coming from actual Euclidean distances.
Points that realize optimally similar distances can then be found by semidefinite approximation (and low rank approximation, if desired) using linear algebraic tools such as singular value decomposition or semidefinite programming.
This is known as multidimensional scaling.
Variants of these methods can also deal with incomplete distance data.

Unlabeled data, that is, a set or multiset of distances not assigned to particular pairs, is much more difficult to deal with.
Such data arises, for example, in DNA sequencing (specifically, genome recovery from partial digest) or phase retrieval.
Two sets of points are called homometric if they have the same multiset of distances (but are not necessarily related by a rigid transformation).
Deciding whether a given multiset of  distances can be realized in a given dimension  is strongly NP-hard.
In one dimension this is known as the turnpike problem; it is an open question whether it can be solved in polynomial time.
When the multiset of distances is given with error bars, even the one dimensional case is NP-hard.
Nevertheless, practical algorithms exist for many cases, e.g. random points.

Uniqueness of representations
Given a Euclidean distance matrix, the sequence of points that realize it is unique up to rigid transformations – these are isometries of Euclidean space: rotations, reflections, translations, and their compositions.

Rigid transformations preserve distances so one direction is clear.
Then the   Gram matrix of remaining vectors  is identical to the Gram matrix of vectors .
This implies there exists an orthogonal  matrix  such that , see Definite symmetric matrix#Uniqueness up to unitary transformations.

In applications, when distances don't match exactly, Procrustes analysis aims to relate two point sets as close as possible via rigid transformations, usually using singular value decomposition.
The ordinary Euclidean case is known as the orthogonal Procrustes problem or Wahba's problem (when observations are weighted to account for varying uncertainties).
Examples of applications include determining orientations of satellites, comparing molecule structure (in cheminformatics), protein structure (structural alignment in bioinformatics), or bone structure (statistical shape analysis in biology).

See also
 Adjacency matrix
 Coplanarity
 Distance geometry
 Hollow matrix
 Distance matrix
 Euclidean random matrix
 Classical multidimensional scaling, a visualization technique that approximates an arbitrary dissimilarity matrix by a Euclidean distance matrix
 Cayley–Menger determinant
 Semidefinite embedding

Notes

References
 
 
 
 
 

Matrices
Distance